The 1802 Pennsylvania gubernatorial election occurred on October 12, 1802. Incumbent Democratic-Republican governor Thomas McKean successfully sought re-election to another term. As occurred in his prior campaign, he defeated U.S. Senator James Ross, a Federalist.

Results

References

1802
Gubernatorial
Pennsylvania
November 1802 events